Jamieson Kirkwood Parker (January 28, 1895 – December 8, 1939) was an American government administrator and architect from Oregon, working primarily in Portland and Salem.  He worked as an architect for the better part of two decades, before changing to federal and state government work, culminating in his serving as director of the Oregon division of the Federal Housing Administration from mid-1935 until his death in late 1939.

Early life and education
Jamieson Parker was born in Portland, Oregon, on January 28, 1895.  He graduated from the University of Pennsylvania in 1916, and began working as an architect in Portland shortly thereafter. During World War I, he served as a second lieutenant of the Coast Artillery.

Career
Except during his period of wartime military service, Parker worked as an architect from 1916 until 1934, and at one time was president of the Oregon chapter of the American Institute of Architects.

In January 1934, he was appointed district officer for the survey of historic buildings in Oregon and Washington, on the recommendation of the U.S. Interior Department.  He subsequently became assistant to the director of the Federal Housing Administration's Oregon division and, in December 1934, the division's associate director.  He was named FHA director for Oregon in June 1935 and served in that post until his death in 1939.

Works
Works include:

Salem
Curtis Cross House (1924), 1635 Fairmount Ave S, designed by architect Clarence L. Smith and completed by Jamieson Parker, listed on the National Register of Historic Places
Carl E. Nelson House (1924), 960 E St NE, NRHP-listed

Portland
Parish of St. Mark, 1025 NW 21st Ave
First Unitarian Church of Portland, 1011 SW 12th Ave, NRHP-listed
Caroline W. and M. Louise Flanders House, 2421 SW Arden Rd, NRHP-listed
Frederick and Grace Greenwood House, 248 SW Kingston Ave, NRHP-listed
William A. Haseltine House, 3231 NE U.S. Grant Place, NRHP-listed
Edward D. Kingsley House, 2132 SW Montgomery Drive, NRHP-listed
Donald and Ruth McGraw House, 01845 SW Military Rd, NRHP-listed

Death
Parker died at St. Vincent's Hospital, on December 8, 1939, after an illness lasting one month.

References

1895 births
1939 deaths
Architects from Portland, Oregon
20th-century United States government officials
University of Pennsylvania alumni